The Rugby sevens competition at the 2011 Commonwealth Youth Games in Douglas, Isle of Man will be held in September 2011 at The Bowl Stadium.

Qualification
A total of 8 teams will compete in this tournament. The host nations Isle of Man and Scotland as hosts of the 2014 Commonwealth Games get automatic entries into the tournament, along with the highest ranked nation of the Commonwealth's six regions (Africa, Americas, Asia, Caribbean, Europe and Oceania).

Preliminary round

Group A

Group B

Knockout stage

References

External links
Official website

2011 Commonwealth Youth Games events
Commonwealth Youth Games
2011 Commonwealth Youth Games